This is a list of soaring birds, which are birds that can maintain flight without wing flapping, using rising air currents. Many gliding birds are able to "lock" their extended wings by means of a specialized tendon.

Bird of prey

 Buzzards
 Condors
 Eagles
 Falcons
 Harriers
 Hawks' Kites 
 Osprey
 Secretary bird
 Vultures

Passerine

Choughs
Raven
Woodswallows

Cranes

Sandhill

Herons

Storks

Sea birds

 Albatrosses
 Frigatebirds
 Gulls
 Pelicans
 Petrels
 Shearwaters
 Terns

Extinct
 Argentavis

See also
Flying and gliding animals
Shearwaters which use a similar technique

References
Soaring at Stanford Birds hosted by Stanford University and  based on The Birder's Handbook'' by Paul R. Ehrlich, David S. Dobkin, and Darryl Wheye
MTB Naturalist - our East Bay Soaring Birds by Duncan Parks
Birds, Thermals & Soaring Flight at aerospaceweb.org by Jeff Scott, 4 December 2005

Lists of birds
Birds